The Deputy Chief Justice of the Supreme Court of Indonesia refers to two separate positions on the Supreme Court of Indonesia. Both are elected from the existing members of the court as is the case with the higher ranking Chief Justice of the Supreme Court of Indonesia.

List of Deputy Chief Justices

Deputy of Judicial Affairs

Deputy of non-Judicial Affairs

See also
 Deputy Chief Justice of the Constitutional Court of Indonesia

References

Supreme Court of Indonesia